Saint-Romain-en-Gal is a commune in the Rhône department in eastern France. Vienne, Isère is on the opposite bank of the river and the two settlements are linked by a footbridge and a road bridge.

See also
Communes of the Rhône department

References

Communes of Rhône (department)